Daniel Whitelaw Reese (19 October 1898 – 11 January 1954) was a New Zealand cricketer. He played six first-class matches for Canterbury between 1917 and 1921.

Life and career
Reese was born in 1898. His parents were Thomas Wilson Reese and Georgina Whitelaw Reese. His uncle, also called Dan Reese, captained the New Zealand cricket team for several years before World War I. Young Daniel attended Christ's College, Christchurch, where he captained the First XI in 1917.

Reese made his first-class debut at the age of 19 in the 1917–18 season. In his second match, later that season, he played in the same Canterbury team as his father, who was playing his last first-class match at the age of 50. His best match was against Otago in 1920–21, when he took 5 for 33 in the second innings and followed up with his highest score, 27.

From 1923 Reese spent time in Australia broadening his business experience. When he returned to New Zealand he worked as a marine engineer and a businessman with interests in engineering, shipping and timber.

Reese married Dorothy Moreland in Melbourne in January 1926. She died in October 1935. He died suddenly in Melbourne on 11 January 1954, survived by his second wife, Kathleen.

References

External links
 

1898 births
1954 deaths
People educated at Christ's College, Christchurch
New Zealand cricketers
Canterbury cricketers
Cricketers from Christchurch
20th-century New Zealand businesspeople